The Poesten Kill is a  creek in upstate New York located entirely in Rensselaer County, which flows westerly from its source at Dyken Pond in the town of Berlin to its mouth at the Hudson River in the city of Troy. It has been used historically as a source of water for local inhabitants and farmers and became even more important as a source of water power during the Industrial Revolution, during which many mills and factories sprung up along its banks.

Its name is derived from a local farmer and miller, Jan Barensten Wemple also known by the nickname "Wemp" or "Poest", that lived near the creek in the 1660s, and the Dutch word kill, meaning creek at.

Geography

While many small streams discharge into the Poesten Kill, there are only four notable tributaries of the creek. Bonesteel Creek runs southerly from Bonesteel and Hosjord Ponds and connects with the Poesten Kill in the town of Poestenkill between the hamlets of Barberville and Ives Corner. Newfoundland Creek is the next tributary and joins the Poesten Kill just west of the hamlet of Poestenkill. The Quacken Kill is the next tributary and connects in the town of Poestenkill near the Brunswick border. The Quacken Kill begins at Long Pond at Grafton Lakes State Park and continues through Second Pond and Mill Pond, also in the park, before continuing through Dunham Reservoir near central Grafton. The next major tributary is Sweet Milk Creek, which begins as a stream in north central Brunswick and travels about  before combining in the southwestern portion of the town.

The Poesten Kill travels about  through Rensselaer County before flowing into the Hudson River.

Waterfalls
There are a number of notable waterfalls along the course of the Poesten Kill and its tributaries.

History

The Dutch

Prior to the arrival of Europeans, the Mohicans occupied the land through which the Poesten Kill flows. However, the mouth of the Poesten Kill at the Hudson is said to be first genuine European frontier settlement outside the barricades of Fort Orange.

The land making up much of current-day Albany and Rensselaer counties was sold by the Mohicans in 1630 to Kiliaen van Rensselaer, a Dutch merchant and businessman. With the land, Van Rensselaer began the only successful patroonship – essentially a feudal manor – in the history of the Dutch colonies: Rensselaer wyck. Van Rensselaer named the land surrounding the mouth of the Poesten Kill Pafraets Dael after his mother, Maria Parfait. This can be seen on the first map of Rensselaerswyck, though the Poesten Kill is not identified.

The Dutch can be credited for the source of the creek's name. In 1661, Jan Barentse Wemp, an independent farmer-trader, began a lease for a farm with Jan Baptist van Rensselaer, Kiliaen's oldest son and the patroon at the time. The land extended south from the Poesten Kill to the north bank of the Wynants Kill, which empties into the Hudson in South Troy. At the time, residents would commonly go by a recognizable nickname, to distinguish themselves in local records. Wemp went by "Poest". Add the Dutch word kill, meaning "creek", and the source of the name Poesten Kill becomes clear.

While most of the settlements along or near the Poesten Kill during the Dutch era revolved around farming, some were also based on easy access to the Mohicans for trade in fur. The Indians, likewise, were more than happy to cut their trip by miles, since they would no longer have to go to Fort Orange. At the time, the fur trade was legally monopolized by the Dutch West India Company, so this practice was illegal, but very profitable.

Rensselaer wynk was taken over by the English in 1664, though the legal existence of the patroonship was not challenged.

In the 1600s, a sawmill was built at the base of Poesten kill falls by Jan Barentsen Wemple and was passed on to his wife, Marytie Mynderse after his passing.

In the 1800s, many mills and factories were built along this river to use water power or have easy access to the Hudson on a riverside road beginning just after Poesten kill Falls. This included a bridge that spanned the creek just after the falls, and this bridge is no longer around but remains of the old factories still can be seen along the north side of the river. Small dirt paths are all that is left of the roads on the north side of the creek between the falls and prospect park.

Dangers of the Falls 
The Poesten kill falls have been always been a sight to see for hikers and the public, but there are dangers associated with climbing and being around the fast waters that flow through the creek after floods and winter thaws. Most recently in February 2017, a young man fell went missing and was found dead in the Hudson days later.

The Poestenkill Gorge Today 
Located right behind RPI's polytechnic dorm. The Poesten kill gorge is also known by many names such as Mount Ida Falls, Wire Mill Falls, and Poesten kill High Falls. It's the largest waterfall found on the Poesten Kill river system, which consists of 6 distinct drops totaling to about 150 feet; the tallest drop at around 30 feet. The average width of the stream is 15 feet with 50 feet being the max in some areas. At the base of the fall, it was mostly pebbles ranging from 1 cm pebbles to large boulders. Also at the base, 10 feet above there was a hollow cave-like structure that resembles a rock shelter. It can be accessed from the base through climbing and connects to the upper level of the waterfall where pockets of water lie. The upper portion of these falls is viewable almost completely from a private residence up the hill from the park's parking area on Linden Ave. There are some other areas to view the waterfalls from the top of the Gorge off of Rt. 2, uphill from the Cookie Factory.

There are two access points located on each side of the river. A private company has a small power station that still produces electricity from hydro power on the north side of the river that was built in the 1950s and used turbines inside the remains of the concrete foundation of the old industrial mills. A gate blocked the entrance to this access point but since has been removed. This road existed since the 1870s but had been closed off in the 1990s when the city of Troy discontinued maintenance of this park even though it still owns the land. This road leads to a small dirt path tangled with saplings and roots along old industrial remains from the Marshall Factories. This dirt path is where the bridge access road used to be due to the lack of any full grown trees and a clearing. The path splits into two paths, one leading towards the sublime foundation of an old mill with one brick archway standing. Along the northern riverbank, there is obvious stone bricks, shale from mill foundations, clay bricks from the old mill inscribed “Bleau”, and steel rods from where bridges and walkways used to traverse and cross the gorge. The bricks inscribed “Bleau” were made in a brick factory in Mechanicville across the Hudson and used to make up a mill from the 1700s.

Walking along the riverbank provides no sure footing due to the deposits of rubble and driftwood along the banks. An interesting sight is the rock walls of the waterfalls that indicate all dirt and clay has been washed away by the constant barrage of water. During the spring, melt water and a lack of dam upstream causes the water to flow much more violently, discharging water faster and preventing access to most of the waterfall riverbanks. During the winter, the colder weather along with snow cover much of the surrounding banks, and a thick layer of ice forms across the river. When summer comes, most of the ice from winter has melted and the lower river discharge exposes the banks finally. Students from RPI and the community surrounding the area often come to the gorge to take a drip and to relax during the hot summer days.

See also
List of rivers of New York

Notes

References

Bibliography

External links

Barberville Falls at The Nature Conservancy

Rivers of New York (state)
Rivers of Rensselaer County, New York
Tributaries of the Hudson River